SG Formula is a French auto racing team which participated in the junior categories of open wheel racing: Formula Renault and Formula Three. The team was founded in 2004 by Frenchman Stephane Guerin.

History
After its foundation in 2004, SG Formula began racing in a number of Formula Renault championships with their drivers Yann Clairay, Guillaume Moreau and Romain Grosjean, with the team's concentrating mostly on the French championship with a handful of participations in the European and Swiss championships. The team enjoyed some success in its inaugural year of motorsport with Clairay and Moreau finishing second and third respectively in the French Drivers' Championship and Grosjean finished as runner-up rookie. The team finished second in that year's Team's Championship with 649 points; 27 points off champions Graff Racing. Wins were also present in SG Formula's other championships, including a win for Clairay at Magny-Cours in the European series and a win in the single entry they had in the Swiss championship.

2005 spread their wings into a number of other championships: While still remaining in the French and European series, with intentions to run a full championship campaign in both, they entered a selected number of events in the Dutch championship while dropping their involvement in the Swiss series. The team retained its drivers, bar Moreau who had moved to fellow French team Signature-Plus; Carlo van Dam, Johan Charpilienne and Julien Jousse were added at the team's roster. The team enjoyed far more success than the previous year, with Grosjean winning the Drivers' Championship in France and the team picked up the Team's Championship in the Eurocup as well as in the French series. The Dutchman van Dam also managed to score three podiums in the Dutch championship as well. At the end of the year, after partnering with Dyna Ten Motorsport, the team entered a Support Race for the Macau Grand Prix where the team finished twelfth and thirteenth.

Like Moreau before him, Grosjean jumped ship to Signature-Plus for a campaign in Formula Three, which is what SG Formula could not offer the French driver at the time. Clairay also entered a limited number of races for the team as he was concentrating on his Le Mans Series campaign with Paul Belmondo Racing; Charpilienne also left the team at the end of 2005. Van Dam and Jousse stayed with SG Formula for 2006 with Red Bull-backed Tom Dillmann joining the Dutch driver for the Eurocup team and rookie Jean Karl Vernay joining Jousse for the French championship. The two entries did well in their respective championships, with the Eurocup team finishing second in the Team's Championship, with Van Dam finishing third in the Drivers' Championship, and Vernay finished the year as both runner-up in the Drivers' and Rookie championship in the French Championship with a Team Championship for a second year in a row as well.

The team ran two Eurocup teams in 2007 named SG Formula and SG Driver's Project and hired a number of new drivers to their roster. Brit Jon Lancaster finished the season as runner-up to New Zealander Brendon Hartley with Charles Pic finishing behind him in third. The team also claimed that year's Team title in the Eurocup. In the French championship, incidentally the last championship before the series became the West European Cup, the team enjoyed their best season with Jules Bianchi taking home the Drivers' Title and the team won the Team's championship for the third year in succession.

SG Formula stepped up to Formula Three in 2008 by entering a team for the Formula Three Euroseries with a three-man team of former driver Clairay, Dutch driver Henkie Waldschmidt and Tom Dillmann, and ended up 6th in the teams' championship – mainly thanks to Clairay's solid finishing – which led him to 9th overall.

The team will return in 2009, with Lancaster returning to the team along with Waldschmidt, with Andrea Caldarelli moving up from the Eurocup.

At the beginning of 2010, the team withdrew from the Formula Renault 3.5 Series, Formula Three Euroseries and Eurocup Formula Renault 2.0.

Complete motor racing results

Formula Renault

 D.C. = Drivers' Championship position, T.C. = Teams' Championship position.

Formula Three

† - Ricciardo was ineligible to score points.
* - Season still in progress

D.C. = Drivers' Championship position, T.C. = Teams' Championship position.

References

External links
Official website

French auto racing teams
World Series Formula V8 3.5 teams
Formula Renault Eurocup teams
Formula 3 Euro Series teams
Auto racing teams established in 2004